Dail Michael John Jones   (born 7 July 1944) is a New Zealand politician. He has been  a member of the New Zealand First party, and was formerly in the National Party.

Early life
Jones was born in Karachi, British India, and attended St Joseph's College Quetta and Garrison School, Quetta and Karachi Grammar School. He and his mother arrived in New Zealand in 1960, and he completed his education at St Paul's College, Auckland, and the University of Auckland, from where he earned an LLB. He began practice as a lawyer.

Member of Parliament

As such Dail Jones was the first person from Pakistan to become a New Zealand Member of Parliament. In the following election, the Waitemata seat was abolished, and Jones was elected as the MP for Helensville. He retained this electorate until the 1984 election, when Helensville electorate was abolished. Jones contested the new  electorate, but was defeated by the Labour Party candidate, Jack Elder.

Jones was Junior Whip for National in 1979.  From April 1982 to June 1984, Jones was Deputy Chairman of Committees.

Jones is known as one of the few New Zealand MPs to have been injured in a politically motivated attack; in 1980, while serving as a National Party MP, he was stabbed in the chest by an elderly constituent in his electorate office leaving him with a punctured lung. The assailant, Ambrose Tindall, was obsessed about a traffic ticket totaling $15.

New Zealand First
He was ranked in tenth place on the New Zealand First list. He was New Zealand First spokesperson on foreign affairs, trade, customs, the courts, and the attorney-general's role. He was elected President of New Zealand First when Doug Woolerton resigned.

More recently, there have been frictions between Jones, Doug Woolerton and New Zealand First social liberal Brian Donnelly over the repeal of Section 59 of the Crimes Act 1961, legislation that allowed the use of parental corporal punishment against children (or spanking).

Dail Jones stated that "custard is more dangerous than second-hand smoke. ...[and] milk ... is worse than second-hand smoke".

He also attracted criticism in February 2008 from Winston Peters for suggesting that New Zealand First had received large anonymous donations.

On 15 February 2008, Jones was returned to Parliament as a list MP once more, replacing Brian Donnelly, who had been appointed as New Zealand's High Commissioner to the Cook Islands. Two people ahead of him on the party list, Susan Baragwanath and Jim Peters, declined the position, and he resigned as party President after becoming an MP.

In March 2008, he was critical  of fellow NZ First MP Peter Brown's views on Asian immigration.

He left politics after this election.

Honours
In the 2006 New Year Honours, Jones was appointed a Companion of the Queen's Service Order, for public services.

Notes

References

Works cited

External links
Dail Jones, New Zealand Parliament website

Living people
1944 births
Companions of the Queen's Service Order
Karachi Grammar School alumni
New Zealand First MPs
New Zealand National Party MPs
20th-century New Zealand lawyers
University of Auckland alumni
Pakistani emigrants to New Zealand
New Zealand list MPs
Members of the New Zealand House of Representatives
New Zealand MPs for Auckland electorates
People educated at St Paul's College, Auckland
Unsuccessful candidates in the 2005 New Zealand general election
Unsuccessful candidates in the 2008 New Zealand general election
Unsuccessful candidates in the 1984 New Zealand general election
21st-century New Zealand politicians